Pamplemousses Sporting Club is a Mauritian football club based in Belle Vue Harel. They play in the top division in Mauritian football.

Ground
Their home stadium is Stade Anjalay (cap. 18,000), located in Belle Vue Maurel, Pamplemousses.

Achievements
Mauritian League: 6

2005–06, 2010, 2011–12, 2016–17, 2017–18, 2018–19

Mauritian Cup: 3
2009, 2016, 2018

Mauritian Republic Cup: 4
2010, 2011, 2012–13, 2016–17

Performance in CAF competitions
CAF Champions League: 3 appearances
2007 – Preliminary Round
2018 – Preliminary Round
2020 – Preliminary Round

CAF Confederation Cup: 2 appearances
2010 – Preliminary Round
2017 – Preliminary Round

African record

External links
ZeroZeroFootball Profile

References

Football clubs in Mauritius
2000 establishments in Mauritius
Association football clubs established in 2000
Pamplemousses District